Cristalle Lauren Tupaz Ranillo-Lim (born 10 December 1984), known professionally as Krista Ranillo, is a Filipino actress. She comes from a "showbiz family" and earned her degree in 2007. In 2010 she married businessman Nino Jefferson Lim in a Jewish-interfaith ceremony. She has reportedly taken off from acting to pursue a law degree.

Television

Movies
Wapakman (2009)
Paupahan (2008)
Iskul Bukol: 20 Years After (2008)
Most Wanted (2000)
Two Timer (2002)

See also
Pieta

References

Living people
Filipino television personalities
1981 births
Krista
Star Magic
People from Quezon City
Actresses from Metro Manila
GMA Network personalities
TV5 (Philippine TV network) personalities
ABS-CBN personalities